The Treaty of Blois can refer to one of the four treaties signed in the French city of Blois, in the early sixteenth century, between the Spanish kingdoms and France:

 Treaty of Blois (1504) (1st Treaty of Blois), of September 22, 1504, which proposed a marriage between Charles of Luxembourg (the future Emperor Charles V) and Claude of France, daughter of Louis XII.  The marriage was eventually cancelled, however. 
 Treaty of Blois (1505) (2nd Treaty of Blois), of October 12, 1505, was concluded between Louis XII of France and Ferdinand II of Aragon the marriage of the latter to the French-allied Germaine of Foix.
 Treaty of Blois (1509) (3rd Treaty of Blois), of December 12, 1509, an alliance between Ferdinand II of Aragon (and now regent of Castile), Holy Roman Emperor Maximilian I, and King Louis XII of France in the War of the League of Cambrai in northern Italy.
 Treaty of Blois (1512) (4th Treaty of Blois), of July 18, 1512, a defensive pact between Navarre and France to respect Navarre's neutrality, whereby Francis I of France also recognizes the sovereignty of the Principality of Béarn.

It can also refer to two unrelated treaties:
 Treaty of Blois (1499), an alliance between France and Venice against the Duchy of Milan.
 Treaty of Blois (1572), an agreement to have free trade and a military alliance between England and France against Spain in the Spanish Netherlands.

See also
 Blois
 Italian Wars